Krewe of Mid-City is the 5th oldest continually-parading New Orleans Mardi Gras krewe.

History and formation
Founded in 1933 by Charles A. Bourgeois, the original members were men from the Mid-City Civic Association. The first parade comprised six small floats drawn by mules, a handful of marching bands and riders on horseback.

Since  The death of Float designer Betty Ray Kern Sister of Blaine Kern, 1999 the parade floats were designed and decorated by New Orleans Artist and float designer Ricardo Pustanio.  Pustanio designed the parade from 1999-2020.

Membership
Krewe of Mid-City membership is limited to 350 members. Joining involves receiving an invitation from an existing member, completing an application process, approval of the application by the board of directors, and timely payment of dues.

Parade
Krewe of Mid-City parades on Dimanche Gras, the Sunday prior to Fat Tuesday, on the uptown route. The parade follows the uptown route for parades starting at Napoleon Avenue and Magazine Street; proceed north to St. Charles; proceed east on St. Charles to Lee Circle continuing on St. Charles to Canal Street.

The parade is unique for its one-of-a-kind foil-covered floats. Originally designed and decorated by Betty Ray Kern until her death in 1992. And by Ricardo Pustanio from 1999-2020.

Parade themes

Royal court
Krewe of Mid-City present a King and Queen annually. Fitting with the Krewe's double-heart logo, the King and Queen of Mid-City are traditionally a married or engaged couple.

Throws
Trinkets, collectables, masks, and beads tossed by hand from riders of the floats are called throws. Collectible throws from Krewe of Mid-City include heart-shaped mascot dolls, the Captain's pewter anodized doubloons, and krewe-emblem potato chips.

References 

Mardi Gras in New Orleans